The Pherzawl district of Manipur state in India was carved out of the Churachandpur district in 2016, and comprises 4 subdivisions.

Subdivisions 

As of 2022, the Pherzawl district comprises 4 sub-divisions: Pherzawl (non-functional), Thanlon, Parbung-Tipaimukh, and Vangai Range. At the time of the 2011 census, only the Thanlon and Tipaimukh subdivisions existed, as part of the Churachandpur district.

Villages

Vangai Range 

The district website (2022) lists the following additional villages, which were not part of the 2011 census directory.

 Henchungpunji Muslim
 Jeisuo
 Kangrengdhor
 Khangbor
 Moinador (Hmarkhothar)
 Phulpui
 Thingkaldhor
 Upper Kharkhuplien

Thanlon block 

The district website (2022) lists the following additional villages, which were not part of the 2011 census directory.

 Bungpilon
 Buolmuol
 C.Zalen
 Khajang
 Mongon
 Muikot
 New Muntha
 Pamjal
 Phainuam
 Sainoujang
 Saite
 Suohthumphai
 T. Maojang
 T. Phaikholum
 Tangnuom
 Tongkham
 Tuikumuallum
 Tuipiphai
 Vaipheimuol
 Zoupi

Tipaimukh block 

The district website (2022) lists the following additional villages, which were not part of the 2011 census directory.

 H. Maulien
 Serhmun
 Tallan
 Tipaimukh (distinct from "Sipuikon/Tipaimukh")
 Tuolbung

References 

Pherzawl